is a Japanese manga series written by Hiroaki Igano and illustrated by Kaya Tsukiyama. The series is serialized in Weekly Shōnen Magazine beginning in 2006 and is currently ongoing. The story follows Kakeru Aizawa, who received the heart of his soccer prodigy older brother Suguru Aizawa after an accident, as he aims to achieve his brother's dream of winning the World Cup.



Volume list

Volumes 1–20

Volumes 21–40

Volumes 41–current

References

Knight in the Area